Olkhovka is a rural locality (a settlement) in Yugo-Kamskoye Rural Settlement, Permsky District, Perm Krai, Russia. The population was 19 as of 2010.

Geography 
It is located 19 km north-east from Yugo-Kamsky.

References 

Rural localities in Permsky District